Eckerö Linjen is a Finnish shipping company operating a ferry between Berghamn harbour in Eckerö in the Åland Islands and Grisslehamn in Sweden. The company is owned by the Åland based Rederiaktiebolaget Eckerö. Eckerö Linjen should not be confused with its similarly named sister company Eckerö Line, which operates ferry services between Helsinki in Finland and Tallinn in Estonia.

History
Eckerö Linjen began trafficking between Eckerö in Åland and Grisslehamn in Sweden in 1961. This route is much shorter than the one sailed by Viking Line, Eckerö Linjen's main competitor in the Åland - Sweden traffic, taking only two hours to cross. Partially as a result of this Eckerö Linjen operated its first two decades on small used ferries, until the acquisition of the first M/S Eckerö in 1982. Since January 2005 the route is operated by the second MS Eckerö, a notably larger ship than the ones that have previously sailed on the line, with the second  used as an extra ship during the summer high season.

Although Eckerö Linjen and Eckerö Line are technically separate companies, ships from one company have often been used to cover for ships of the other during dockings and technical malfunctions.

Fleet
 MS Eckerö - Eckerö — Grisslehamn
 MS Finlandia
 MS Birka
 MS Exporter
 MS Shipper
 MS Transporter
 MS Finbo Cargo

See also
 Eckerö Line
 Transport in Åland

External links
 Eckerö Linjen official website

Ferry companies of Finland
Ferry companies of Sweden
Companies of Åland